Faßberg (ang. Fassberg) is a municipality in the district of Celle, in Lower Saxony, Germany. It is situated approximately 35 km north of Celle, and 30 km west of Uelzen.

History
The pre-war history of Fassberg air base includes a number of interesting details and well-known names. From the spring of 1933, not only airfields and planes were built for the German Air Force, numerous training centres were also created, and in the first years, because of the Versailles Treaty, they were called by names that veiled their real purpose.

Places of interest
 Historic village centre of Müden (Örtze)
 Berlin Airlift memorial
 St. Laurentius church
 Treppenspeicher barns from the 18th and 19th centuries
 Old village square with its old smithy with Sod and Wippe
 Old cemetery with the graves of poet Felicitas Rose and artist Fritz Flebbe
 Former residence of the heath poet Felicitas Rose
 Hermann Löns memorial plaque on house at Salzmoor 2a
 Heath farmsteads with Treppenspeicher barns in Schmarbeck and Oberohe
 Löns Stone with area of heathland on the Wietzer Berg (towards Hermannsburg on the L214 state road)
 Haußelberg with large areas of heath near Gerdehus
 Juniper wood and shattered glacial erratic boulders in the heathland of Schmarbeck
 Kiehnmoor nature reserve near Schmarbeck
 Historic water mill in Müden (now a tourist office, bookshop and marriage office)
 Deer park and adventurous climbing park in Heuweg in Müden (Örtze)
 German Aerospace Center Trauen Institute of Propulsion Technology, Engine / Fire Safety (Abt. Triebwerk, Gruppe Brandschutz)

Bibliography 
 Matthias Blazek: Die geheime Großbaustelle in der Heide – Faßberg und sein Fliegerhorst 1933–2013. Ibidem, Stuttgart 2013, .
 Michael Ende, Peter Müller, Urs Müller: Celle – Stadt und Landkreis. Medien-Verlag Schubert, Hamburg 2007, .
 Christoph M. Glombek: Chronik der Gemeinde Faßberg mit den Ortschaften Müden/Örtze, Poitzen und Schmarbeck. Faßberg 2002.
 Hans Stärk: Geschichte von Faßberg. Faßberg 1971.
 Faßberg – Luft- und Raumfahrt in der Heide. Magazine for the AeroSpaceDay Faßberg, edited by the municipality of Faßberg, Faßberg 2013, .

References

External links 
 Generalmajor Dipl.Ing. Robert Krauß (1894–1953) at the Bomber-Flying-School Faßberg (01 Oct 1936-31 Dec 1936)

Celle (district)